Dictyochales (Silicoflagellates, or Dictyochophyceae sensu stricto) are a small group of unicellular heterokont algae, found in marine environments.

Characteristics
In one stage of their life cycle, they produce a siliceous skeleton, composed of a network of bars and spikes arranged to form an internal basket.  These form a small component of marine sediments, and are known as microfossils from as far back as the early Cretaceous.

Classification
The algae in the Dictyochophyceae have been previously classified in the Chrysophyceae. There is one living genus, Dictyocha, with two commonly recognised species.  There are also several extinct genera, but their classification is difficult, since skeletons may show diverse forms within each living species.

Dictyocha has one golden-brown chloroplast and a long flagellum extended into a wing-like shape.  The skeleton-bearing stage is uninucleate, with many microtubule-supported projections, and there are also uninucleate and micronucleate stages that do not produce skeletons, but how they relate to each other is poorly understood.  The cell structure places the silicoflagellates in a group called the axodines.

Terminology
They are usually treated as an order, called the Dictyochales by botanists and the Silicoflagellida by zoologists.

"Dictyochophyceae" and "silicoflagellates" are sometimes equated.

References

Dictyochophyceae
Heterokont orders